Kevan Michael Shokat (born August 26, 1964) is an American chemical biologist. He is a Professor and Chair in the Department of Cellular and Molecular Pharmacology at University of California, San Francisco, a Professor in the Department of Chemistry at University of California, Berkeley, and an Investigator with the  Howard Hughes Medical Institute.

Biography
Shokat received his B.A, in chemistry from Reed College in 1986, completing his thesis, "Synthesis of a precursor of PRCPCP, a non-hydrolyzable analog of phosphoribosylpyrophosphate (PRPP)," with Ron McClard,  and his Ph.D. from  University of California, Berkeley in 1991, under Peter G. Schultz.

Research
Shokat is one of the leading figures in the field of chemical genetics.  He uses methods of bioorganic chemistry to elucidate signal transduction pathways at the single cell and whole organism levels, and is particularly interested in protein kinases, and developing methods to elucidate the particular targets of each kinase, such as the Bump and hole method. 

In 2013 Shokat published the first covalent inhibitors of KRAS G12C using a tethering screen. Following this strategy many pharma companies have developed KRAS programs leading to phase I/II clinical trials in this space, a landmark for what was once thought to be an undruggable oncogene.

Honors and awards
 1996 Pew Scholar
 1997 Searle Scholar
 1997 Cottrell Scholar
 1997 Glaxo-Wellcome Scholar in Organic Chemistry
 1999 Alfred P. Sloan Research Fellow
 2000 Protein Science Young Investigator Award
 2002 Eli Lilly Award in Biological Chemistry
 2009 Elected to the National Academy of Sciences
 2010 Elected to the National Academy of Medicine
 2011 Elected to the American Academy of Arts and Sciences
 2011 Ronald Breslow Award for Achievement in Biomimetic Chemistry
 2017 Pharmacology Krebs Lecture, University of Washington
 2017 Jonathan Kraft Prize for Excellence in Cancer Research
 2017 Frank H. Westheimer Prize
 2019 ASPIRE Award, The Mark Foundation
 2020 Alfred Bader Award in Bioinorganic or Bioorganic Chemistry
 2021 Samuel Waxman Cancer Research Foundation Breakthrough Science Award
 2022 AACR Award for Outstanding Achievement in Chemistry in Cancer Research
 2023 NAS Award for Scientific Discovery
 2023 Howard Vollum Award
 2023 The Sjöberg Prize

References

External links
Shokat Lab at UCSF
Kevan Shokat HHMI 

American medical researchers
Reed College alumni
Howard Hughes Medical Investigators
1964 births
Living people
University of California, Berkeley alumni
University of California, San Francisco faculty
Members of the National Academy of Medicine
Princeton University faculty